Alf Palmer (–1981), or  in his native language, was the last native speaker of the Australian aboriginal language Warrungu. He lived in Townsville, Queensland, Australia.

He worked together with linguists Tasaku Tsunoda from Japan and Dr. Peter Sutton from Sydney, Australia, to preserve his language. He was anxious for his language to be preserved and repeatedly told Tsunoda, "I'm the last one to speak Warrungu. When I die, this language will die. I'll teach you everything I know, so put it down properly."

External links
An article on Alf Palmer and Warrungu, with photographs

1890s births
1981 deaths
Last known speakers of an Australian Aboriginal language